Brubeck Plays Brubeck is a jazz album by pianist Dave Brubeck. The cover features design by S. Neil Fujita.

The pieces 
All the following statements by Brubeck himself can be found in the original liner notes.

"The "compositions" in this album are not composed in the usual sense of the term. They are primarily sketches - a skeletal framework upon which improvise, to express a mood or emotion or stimulate musical ideas. These little offerings make no pretense as "composition", but at the same time I have tried to construct melody lines which have a certain value of their own, and above all to offer as "original"  something more unique than a new version of the blues."
"I am grateful for the challenge and the opportunity this solo album of "originals" has afforded me.  The challenge lay in improvising on new themes and new chord structures without the rehearsal experience of years of performance."

"Walkin' Line" 
""Walkin' Line" is named for the starkly etched bass, outlined with the melody in the first 8 bars. Gradually more voices are added in the right hand, while the left continues to play a walking bass.[...] For the improvised choruses, I employ a fuller harmonic approach."

"In Your Own Sweet Way" 
""In Your Own Sweet Way" contains three improvised choruses which to me are an example of the cohesiveness that can be obtained in improvisation."

"Two-Part Contention" 
""Two-Part Contention" is divided into three sections, marked by three tempo changes. The first is a medium tempo; the second, slow; and the last, a fast tempo. The written portion of this tune is heard in the opening 32 bars. These two melodic lines are repeated throughout the piece. In the second section, I introduced a pattern of answering the right hand with the left hand, abruptly changing the register of the piano. In the third section, I tried to improvise within the limitation of two lines in the first chorus."

"Weep No More" 
""Weep No More" was written in 1945. The only public performance has been in the ETO, arranged for big band and vocalist."

"The Duke" 
""The Duke" is a tribute to Duke Ellington, recorded with the quartet in a previous album. It is the only completely written, unimprovised piece in the album."

"When I Was Young" 
""When I Was Young" was originally written as a waltz in 1952."

"One Moment Worth Years" 
""One Moment Worth Years" recalls a moment years ago when I bought my first phonograph record. It was Fats Waller's "Fair and Square" backed by "There's Honey on the Moon Tonight". Something of the Waller swinging bass tradition is preserved here."

"The Waltz" 
""The Waltz" contains two improvised choruses which, to me, are quite humorous. Inadvertently, I started to improvised in half-time, then desperately tried to get back into the original tempo. Once back there I decided I rather liked the half-time, so changed again. On each listening, I experience a certain anxiety at this indecision, and then finally surprise and relief when I have metaphorically crossed the tightwire and am once more back to the platform."

Track listing 
All compositions by Brubeck.

 "Swing Bells" 3:39
 "Walkin' Line" 2:47
 "In Your Own Sweet Way" 5:01
 "Two-Part Contention" 5:39
 "Weep No More" 3:59
 "The Duke" 2:54
 "When I Was Young" 3:19
 "One Moment Worth Years" 4:55
 "The Waltz" 3:49

Tracks 1, 2, 3, 5, 7, 8 and 9 recorded on April 18, 1956; tracks 4 and 6 recorded on April 19.

Personnel 
 Dave Brubeck - piano

References 

1956 albums
Columbia Records albums
Dave Brubeck albums
Albums produced by George Avakian
Solo piano jazz albums
Album covers by S. Neil Fujita